Brodiaea insignis is a rare species of flowering plant in the cluster-lily genus known by the common name Kaweah brodiaea. It is endemic to the Sierra Nevada foothills of central Tulare County, California, where it grows along the Tule and Kaweah Rivers. It is considered endangered on the state level.

Description
This perennial produces an inflorescence up to 25 centimeters tall which bears purple to pinkish flowers on long pedicels. Each flower has a narrow cylindrical tube which opens into a flat face of six tepals, each 1 to 1.5 centimeters long. In the center of the flower are three fertile stamens and three staminodes, which are flat, white sterile stamens, each with a two-pointed tip.

References

External links
Jepson Manual Treatment
USDA Plants Profile
Flora of North America
Photo gallery

insignis
Endemic flora of California
Flora of the Sierra Nevada (United States)
Natural history of the California chaparral and woodlands
Natural history of Tulare County, California
Flora without expected TNC conservation status